Bill Hardwick is an American attorney and politician serving as a member of the Missouri House of Representatives. Elected in November 2020 from district 122, he assumed office on January 6, 2021. After redistricting in 2022, he was reelected in district 121.

Early life and education 
Hardwick was born in Rolla, Missouri and graduated from Dixon Senior High School in Dixon, Missouri. He earned a Bachelor of Arts degree in classics from the University of Missouri and a Juris Doctor from the University of Missouri School of Law.

Career 
Hardwick served in the United States Army and Missouri National Guard. He graduated from the United States Army Command and General Staff College and served as an engineer platoon leader and company commander in Baghdad. After graduating from law school, he served as a special assistant U.S. attorney and prosecutor for Pulaski County and St. Robert, Missouri. He was elected to the Missouri House of Representatives in November 2020 and assumed office on January 6, 2021.

Electoral History

State Representative

References 

Living people
People from Rolla, Missouri
People from Waynesville, Missouri
University of Missouri alumni
University of Missouri School of Law alumni
Missouri lawyers
Members of the Missouri House of Representatives
Year of birth missing (living people)